Colchuck Glacier is in the Stuart Range immediately north of Colchuck Peak and Dragontail Peak, in the U.S. state of Washington. Colchuck Glacier is within the Alpine Lakes Wilderness of Wenatchee National Forest. Below the glacier lies Colchuck Lake. The mountain and glacier take their name from the lake, which in Chinook jargon means "cold water".

See also
List of glaciers in the United States

References

Glaciers of the North Cascades
Glaciers of Chelan County, Washington
Glaciers of Washington (state)